El marginal is an Argentine television series, starring Juan Minujín, Nicolás Furtado, Martina Gusmán and Gerardo Romano. It awarded the Golden Martín Fierro award, a Tato award, a  award and also was nominated for a Platino Award for Best Miniseries or TV series.

Series Overview
In the first season, former cop Miguel Palacios is jailed at San Onofre under a fake name and a fake judicial case. His mission is to infiltrate a criminal gang of prisoners and prison guards and gather information about the daughter of a judge kidnapped by said gang.

The second season is a prequel that takes place three years before Miguel Palacios infiltrated San Onofre. Mario Borges and Juan Pablo "Diosito" Borges are sent to San Onofre where they plan to overthrow the leader of the prison, "El Sapo" Quiroga. To achieve that, they ally themselves with the "Sub-21" gang and with Patricio Salgado, a doctor with a mysterious past.

In the third season, the Borges brothers are tasked with taking care of Cristian Pardo, the son of an important businessman, who killed his friend while drunk in a car accident. While Diosito is tasked with the boy's care, the "Sub-21" joins with "Pantera" and Bruni to take down the Borges.

Distribution
The series was initially aired on the Televisión Pública Argentina TV channel. It was acquired by Netflix after the end of the original run, becoming available for Latin America, the United States, the United Kingdom, Spain and Portugal. El Marginal and Estocolmo were the first Argentine TV series acquired by Netflix, in 2016.

A second season was confirmed in 2017. The second series, entitled El Marginal II, debuted on Argentine television in July 2018 to high ratings.

The third series was confirmed by Argentinian production company Underground Producciones in September 2018. One year later, in September 2019, the third series debuted on Netflix.

Awards
The program received 8 nominations for the Martín Fierro Awards, and won for best miniseries and best writers. One of the producers thanked for the award, but criticized the organization of the nominations, as they sometimes include TV programs from very disparate genres. Actor Gerardo Romano used his brief time to ask people to vote for Cristina Fernández de Kirchner at the 2017 legislative elections. At the end of the ceremony, the program received the Golden Martín Fierro Award.

Seasons List

Cast

References

External links
 
 

Golden Martín Fierro Award winners
2016 Argentine television series debuts
Spanish-language Netflix original programming
2010s prison television series